Akilovo is a rural locality (a settlement) in Kochyovskoye Rural Settlement, Kochyovsky District, Perm Krai, Russia. The population was 259 as of 2010. There are 5 streets.

Geography 
Akilovo is located 25 km northwest of Kochyovo (the district's administrative centre) by road. Vorobyovo is the nearest rural locality.

References 

Rural localities in Kochyovsky District